Ask Me What I Am is a 1973 album by actor Burt Reynolds. His only album, it was produced by Bobby Goldsboro and Buddy Killen. The album was released on the Mercury/Phonogram label.

Track listing
 "Childhood 1949" — 3:12 (Bobby Goldsboro)
 "Slow John Fairburn" — 4:00 (Red Lane)
 "The First One That I Lay With" — 2:41 (Red Lane, Tom McKeon)
 "Till I Get It Right" — 2:20 (Larry Henley, Red Lane)
 "She's Taken A Gentle Lover" — 3:50
 "You Can't Always Sing a Happy Song" — 2:38
 "Ask Me What I Am" — 2:50 (Glenn Yarbrough)
 "A Room for a Boy Never Used" — 3:22
 "I Didn't Shake the World Today" — 2:53
 "There's a Slight Misunderstanding Between God and Man" — 3:10
 "I Like Having You Around" — 2:10 (Red Lane)

Performers
 Burt Reynolds – lead vocals
 Buzz Cason, Carol Montgomery, Ginger Holladay - Backing Vocals
 Joe Allen, Mike Leech – Bass
 Larrie London – Drums
 Bobby Goldsboro, Johnny Christopher, Reggie Young – Guitar
 Timmy Tappan – Harpsichord
 Bobby Emmons – Organ
 Bobby Wood – Piano
 Brenton Banks, Byron Bach, Gary Van Osdale, George Brinkley III, Harry Lantz, Jim Stephany, Martha McCrory, Marvin Chantry, Samuel Terranova, Sheldon Kurland, Solie Isaac Fott, Stephanie Woolf, Steven Smith – Strings

References

1973 debut albums
Mercury Records albums